Estrone/progesterone/testosterone (E1/P4/T), sold under the brand name Tristeron or Tristerone, is an injectable combination medication of estrone (E1), an estrogen, progesterone (P4), a progestogen, and testosterone (T), an androgen/anabolic steroid, which was used in the treatment of functional uterine bleeding in women. It contained 6 mg estrone, 50 mg progesterone, and 25 mg testosterone in microcrystalline aqueous suspension and was administered by intramuscular injection. The medication was manufactured by Wyeth and was marketed by 1951. It is no longer available.

See also 
 List of combined sex-hormonal preparations § Estrogens, progestogens, and androgens

References 

Abandoned drugs
Combined estrogen–progestogen–androgen formulations